
The following are lists of Netflix exclusive international distribution programs:

Lists 
List of Netflix exclusive international distribution TV shows
List of Netflix exclusive international distribution films

See also
 List of Netflix original programming
 List of ended Netflix original programming
 List of Netflix original stand-up comedy specials
 Lists of Netflix original films

External links
 Netflix Originals current list on Netflix (based on geolocation)

Netflix lists
exclusive international distribution programming